Atle Gulbrandsen (born 15 September 1979 in Hamar, Norway) is a racing driver and television announcer.

Racing career

Gulbrandsen started with karting in Norway in 1992, and drove some other junior series before he did the Skip Barber Southern Series in the USA in 2003/2004. Since 2005 he has participated in the German VLN Endurance Series at the Nürburgring Nordschleife, with several victories for the Norwegian Audi Dealer Team. In 2007 he also became the Norwegian Seven Racing Champion.

Television career

In 1997 Atle Gulbrandsen became the world's youngest Formula 1 commentator at 17, when he did the announcing for Canal+ Norway. He has since commentated Formula 1 for NRK, TV2, TV3 and Viasat Motor, and been a host for several TV shows about Formula 1, WRC and other motor sports.

He has also been a long time car tester and motoring journalist for several media like Vi Menn, Auto Motor & Sport and Broom. In 2010 he wrote the book "Grand Prix - Historien om Formel 1" together with Morten Malmø. In 2011 he had the voice of "Darrell Cartrip" in the Norwegian version of the Pixar movie Cars 2.

Atle Gulbrandsen also works as a PR-advisor.

References

External links

Official website

Norwegian racing drivers
Living people
1979 births
Audi Sport TT Cup drivers
Sportspeople from Hamar
Nürburgring 24 Hours drivers